Conospermum distichum is a shrub endemic to Western Australia.

It blooms between August and December producing white-blue flowers.

It is found on coastal sand dunes, among granite outcrops, sand plains and along roadsides in the Wheatbelt, Great Southern and Goldfields-Esperance regions of Western Australia where it grows in sandy soils often containing gravel.

References

External links

Eudicots of Western Australia
distichum
Endemic flora of Western Australia
Plants described in 1810
Taxa named by Robert Brown (botanist, born 1773)